Victoria Decka is a Gambian sprinter. She competed in the women's 4 × 100 metres relay at the 1984 Summer Olympics.

References

External links
 

Year of birth missing (living people)
Living people
Athletes (track and field) at the 1984 Summer Olympics
Gambian female sprinters
Olympic athletes of the Gambia
Place of birth missing (living people)
Olympic female sprinters